Narus Inc. was a software company and vendor of big data analytics for cybersecurity.

History
In 1997, Ori Cohen, Vice President of Business and Technology Development for VDONet, founded Narus with Stas Khirman in Israel. Presently, they are employed with Deutsche Telekom AG and are not members of Narus' executive team. In 2010, Narus became a subsidiary of Boeing, located in Sunnyvale, California. In 2015, Narus was sold to Symantec.

Management
In 2004, Narus employed former Deputy Director of the National Security Agency, William Crowell as a director. From the Press Release announcing this:

Narus software

Narus software primarily captures various computer network traffic in real-time and analyzes results.

Before 9/11 Narus built carrier-grade tools to analyze IP network traffic for billing purposes, to prevent what Narus called "revenue leakage". Post-9/11 Narus added more "semantic monitoring abilities" for surveillance.

Mobile
Narus provided Telecom Egypt with deep packet inspection equipment, a content-filtering technology that allows network managers to inspect, track and target content from users of the Internet and mobile phones, as it passes through routers. The national telecommunications authorities of both Pakistan and Saudi Arabia are global Narus customers.

Controversies

AT&T wiretapping room

Narus supplied the software and hardware used at AT&T wiretapping rooms, according to whistleblowers Thomas Drake, and Mark Klein.

See also
 Carnivore (software)
 Communications Assistance For Law Enforcement Act
 Computer surveillance
 ECHELON
 Hepting vs. AT&T, the 2006 lawsuit in which the Electronic Frontier Foundation alleges AT&T allowed the NSA to tap the entirety of its clients' Internet and voice over IP communications using Narus equipment.
 Lincoln (surveillance)
 Room 641A
 SIGINT
 Total Information Awareness
 Verint Systems

References

External links 
Wired News article
Wired News article (AT&T whistleblower Mark Klein discusses Narus STA 6400)

Frontline Flash Video "Spying on the Home Front" TV documentary originally aired on PBS 15 May 2007 with a section entitled "The NSA's Eavesdropping at AT&T" with the story of Mark Klein exposing NSA wiretapping with a secure room and Narus STA 6400 at an AT&T facility in San Francisco, CA

Software companies established in 1997
Software companies based in the San Francisco Bay Area
Companies based in Sunnyvale, California
Defense companies of the United States
Computer security software companies
2010 mergers and acquisitions
2015 mergers and acquisitions
Boeing mergers and acquisitions
Gen Digital acquisitions
Defunct software companies of the United States